Donald L. Heck (January 2, 1929 – February 23, 1995) was an American comics artist best known for co-creating the Marvel Comics characters Iron Man, the Wasp, Black Widow, Hawkeye and Wonder Man and for his long run penciling the Marvel superhero-team series The Avengers during the 1960s Silver Age of comic books.

Biography

Early life and career

Heck was born in the Jamaica neighborhood of Queens, New York City, the son of Bertha and John Heck, of German descent. Heck learned art through correspondence courses as well as at Woodrow Wilson Vocational High School in Jamaica and at a community college in Brooklyn. He continued with an impromptu art education in December 1949 when at the recommendation of a college friend he landed a job at Harvey Comics. There he repurposed newspaper comic strip Photostats into comic-book form — including the work of Heck's idol, famed cartoonist Milton Caniff.

Heck remained at Harvey, where one co-worker in the production department was future comics artist  Pete Morisi, for two-and-a-half years. When a Harvey employee, Allen Hardy, broke off “to start his own line, Media Comics [sic; actually Comic Media], in 1952," Heck recalled in 1993, Hardy “called me up and asked me to join." Heck's first known comics work appeared in two Comic Media titles both cover-dated September 1952: the war comic War Fury #1, for which he penciled and inked the cover and the eight-page story "The Unconquered", by an unknown writer; and the cover and the six-page story "Hitler's Head", also by an unknown writer, in the horror comic Weird Terror #1. Heck's work continued to appear in those titles and in the horror anthology Horrific, for which he designed the logo; the adventure-drama anthology Danger; the Western anthology Death Valley; and other titles through the company's demise in late 1954.

Heck also did freelance assignments for Quality Comics, Hillman Comics, and Toby Press. For publisher U.S. Pictorial in 1955, he drew the one-shot Captain Gallant of the Foreign Legion, a TV tie-in comic based on the 1955–57 syndicated, live-action kids' show of that name.

Atlas Comics
Through his old Harvey Comics colleague Pete Morisi, Heck in 1954 met Marvel Comics’ Stan Lee, then editor-in-chief and art director of Marvel's 1950 predecessor, Atlas Comics. As Heck recalled,

Heck became an Atlas staff artist on September 1, 1954;  his first known work for the company was the five-page horror story "Werewolf Beware" in Mystery Tales  #25 (Jan. 1955), though Heck in 1993 recalled, "The first job I did was about a whale breaking a ship apart. Then I did [the submarine-crew feature] 'Torpedo Taylor' for Navy Combat," drawing that five- or six-page feature in issues #1–14 and 16 (June 1955–Aug. 1957, Feb. 1958) and, oddly, doing one page of a five-page story finished by Joe Maneely in issue #19 (Aug. 1958). Until Atlas' 1957 business retrenchment — when it let go of most of its staff and freelancers and Heck spent a year drawing model airplane views for Berkeley Models — Heck contributed dozens of war comics stories and  Westerns plus a smattering of jungle and science-fiction/fantasy tales.

Atlas began revamping in late 1958 with the arrival of artist Jack Kirby, a comics legend whose career was also in need of revamping, and who threw himself into the anthological science fiction, supernatural mystery, and giant-monster stories of what would become known as "pre-superhero Marvel." Heck returned alongside other soon-to-be-famous names of Marvel Comics' 1960s emergence as a pop culture phenomenon, making his first splash with the cover of Tales of Suspense #1 (Jan. 1959), one of the very few Atlas/Marvel covers of that time not drawn by Kirby. In the years immediately preceding the arrival of the Fantastic Four, Spider-Man, and the other popular heroes of Marvel's ascendancy, Heck gave atmospheric rendering to numerous science fiction / fantasy stories in that comic as well as in sister publications Strange Tales, Tales to Astonish, Strange Worlds, World of Fantasy, and Journey into Mystery.  Heck also contributed to such Atlas/Marvel romance comics as Love Romances and My Own Romance.

Comics artist Jerry Ordway, describing this era of Heck's work, called the artist "truly under-appreciated ... His Atlas work (pre-Marvel) was terrific, with a clean sharp style, and an ink line that wouldn't quit."

Silver Age
During the period fans and historians call the Silver Age of Comic Books, Iron Man premiered in Tales of Suspense #39 (March 1963) as a collaboration among editor and story-plotter Lee, scriptwriter Larry Lieber, story-artist Heck, and Kirby, who provided the cover pencils and designed the first Iron Man armor. Kirby "designed the costume," Heck recalled, "because he was doing the cover. The covers were always done first. But I created the look of the characters, like Tony Stark and his secretary Pepper Potts." Comics historian and former Kirby assistant Mark Evanier, investigating claims of Kirby's involvement in the creation of both Iron Man and Daredevil, interviewed Kirby and Heck on the subject, years before their deaths, and concluded that Kirby

Heck himself recalled in 1985 that while some sources claimed then "that Jack Kirby did breakdowns,"

Heck was the artist co-creator of several new characters in the "Iron Man" feature. The Mandarin debuted in Tales of Suspense #50 (Feb. 1964) and would become one of Iron Man's major enemies. Hawkeye, Marvel's archer supreme, first appeared in Tales of Suspense #57 (Sept. 1964), following the introduction of femme fatale Communist spy and future superheroine and S.H.I.E.L.D. agent the Black Widow in #52 (April 1964). He drew the feature "Iron Man" through issue #46 (Oct. 1963), after which Spider-Man artist Steve Ditko introduced the familiar red-and-gold Iron Man armor and drew three issues. Heck returned with #50 and continued through #72 (Dec. 1965).

Concurrent with drawing Iron Man, Heck succeeded Jack Kirby as penciler on the superhero team series The Avengers with issue #9 (Oct. 1964), the introduction of Wonder Man. The Count Nefaria character was introduced by Lee and Heck four issues later. Heck, who inked his own pencils for many years, transitioned to the "Marvel method" of doing comics — in which the penciler plotted and paced the details of a story based on a synopsis or plot outline from the writer, who would afterward add dialog — and was assigned the help of an inker for the first time. He successfully made this adjustment, and went on to make The Avengers, which he drew through issue #40 (May 1967), plus the 1967 annual, one of his signature series. He inked his own pencil work in issues #32–37. Heck would return to The Avengers one final time to co-plot and pencil issue #45, with inks by Vince Colletta.

During this run, Heck co-created characters including the supervillain and eventual hero the Swordsman, in #19 (Aug. 1965); the supervillain Power Man, who years later became the hero Atlas, in #21 (Oct. 1965); the cosmic entity the Collector in #28 (May 1966); the supporting character Bill Foster, who much later became the superhero Black Goliath, in  #32 (Sept. 1966); and the supervillain the Living Laser in #34 (Nov. 1966). During the next comics era, the Bronze Age, he co-created another cosmic entity, Mantis, in issue #112 (May 1973).

Elsewhere during the 1960s, Heck penciled The X-Men #38–42 (Nov. 1967–March 1968) and introduced the new X-Men Lorna Dane in issue #49 (Oct. 1968) and Havok in #54 (March 1969). Heck drew, over John Romita layouts, The Amazing Spider-Man #57–64 and 66 (Feb.–Sept and Nov. 1968). Heck would also draw issues of Captain Marvel and Iron Man, the World War II war comic Captain Savage and his Battlefield Raiders, horror stories in Chamber of Darkness and Tower of Shadows, and, once more, love stories, in the romance comics Our Love Story and 'My Love.

From 1966 to 1971, Heck was an uncredited "ghost artist" on Lee Falk’s The Phantom daily newspaper comic strip, and later on the Terry and the Pirates daily strip.

Move to DC
By 1970, however, Marvel work became less frequent, and Heck obtained assignments from rival DC Comics, beginning with a short story in the supernatural anthology House of Secrets #85 (May 1970). He did his first DC superhero work with The Flash #198 (June 1970), illustrating a backup story of the super-speedster, and eventually garnered additional work including romance comics, and the backup features "Batgirl" and "Jason Bard" in Detective Comics, and "Rose and the Thorn" in Superman's Girl Friend, Lois Lane. He began a short run on Wonder Woman with issue #204 (Feb. 1973), in which the character's powers and traditional costume were restored after several years, and he also freelanced for the short-lived publisher Skywald Comics.

Heck still occasionally worked at Marvel, penciling the odd issue of Daredevil, Sub-Mariner, Ghost Rider, The Avengers and others in the mid-1970s. He drew Giant-Size Avengers #4 which featured the wedding of the Vision and the Scarlet Witch. Writer Tony Isabella and Heck launched the new superhero team book The Champions in October 1975. But in 1977, he began working almost exclusively for DC. Heck explained in 1985, "I left Marvel for a change of pace. I kept getting all the new inkers. Everyone who walked in, I got them. A bad inker can kill artwork. I once got some pages back from inking and I just tore them up, that's how bad they were."

With writer Gerry Conway, Heck co-created the DC cyborg hero Steel, the Indestructible Man in the premiere issue (March 1978) of the titular comic. After that series' cancellation, Heck became regular artist on  The Flash, and in 1982 reunited with Conway to draw the Justice League of America, including that year's crossover with the All-Star Squadron. Heck then returned to Wonder Woman and drew the title until its cancellation in 1986. Later that same year, he was one of the contributors to the DC Challenge limited series.

Later career
In the late 1980s and early 1990s, Heck returned to Marvel, where his work included features for the superhero anthologies Marvel Comics Presents and Marvel Fanfare. The artist even returned to two signature characters: He inked Hawkeye stories in Solo Avengers #17-20 and the subsequent Avengers Spotlight #21–22 (April–Sept. 1989) — both penciling and inking a second Hawkeye story in that last issue — and he drew Iron Man, inking penciler Mark Bright's eight-page "The Other Way Our" in Marvel Comics Presents #51 (June 1990), and both penciling and inking the one-page featurette "Tony Stark, The Invincible Iron Man" in Iron Man Annual #12 (Sept. 1991) and a pinup in Marvel Super-Heroes vol. 2 #13 (April 1993).

Heck also did a smattering of work for such independent comics as Topps Comics' NightGlider, Hero Comics' Mr. Fixit, Vortex's NASCAR Adventures, and Millennium Publications' H. P. Lovecraft's Cthulhu: The Whisperer in Darkness. His final DC work was penciling and inking over Joe Quesada's layouts for Spelljammer #11 (July 1991), and his last known comics work was the 10-page "The Theft of Thor's Hammer", by writer Bill Mantlo, in Marvel Super-Heroes'' vol. 2 #15 (Oct. 1993).

Marvel one-time editor-in-chief Roy Thomas said of the artist,

Heck died of lung cancer in 1995. He was living in Suffolk County, New York, on Long Island, at the time of his death.

References

External links

The American Artist Bluebook: Don Heck
 "DC Profiles #73: Don Heck" at the Grand Comics Database
 
 Don Heck at Mike's Amazing World of Comics
 Don Heck at the Unofficial Handbook of Marvel Comics Creators

1929 births
1995 deaths
American people of German descent
20th-century American artists
American comics artists
Artists from New York City
DC Comics people
Deaths from lung cancer
Marvel Comics people
People from Centereach, New York
People from Jamaica, Queens
Silver Age comics creators